This is a list of anime films released theatrically in the United States.

References

Theatrically released